Canillas may refer to:
 Canillas (Madrid),  a ward (barrio) of Madrid
 Canillas (Madrid Metro), a station of the Madrid Metro
 Canillas (footballer), a Spanish football player

See also 
 Caniles, a Spanish municipality